Parijat or Nyctanthes arbor-tristis is the night-flowering jasmine.

Parijat may also refer to: 
Parijat (writer) (1937–1993), Nepalese writer
Parijaat tree, Kintoor, a sacred baobab tree in Kintoor, Uttar Pradesh, India
Adansonia digitata, tree

See also
Parijatham (disambiguation)
Paarijatham, a 2008 Malayalam soap opera